The West Virginia Mountaineers rifle team is a co-ed intercollegiate varsity sport of West Virginia University. The rifle team participates in NCAA Division I rifle competitions within the rifle-only Great America Rifle Conference.

West Virginia is the most successful college rifle program in the United States, winning a total of 19 NCAA national team championships. They have won 25 individual NCAA championships, produced 65 All-Americans, and 13 Olympians. Jon Hammond serves as the head coach of the rifle team.

References

External links 
 WVU Rifle

 
1951 establishments in West Virginia